A number of steamships were named Red Jacket.

, laid down as Red Jacket, launched as Quistconck
, laid down as Red Jacket, launched as Inspector

See also

Ship names